Dmytro Serhiyovych Kostiuk (born 1 June 1993) is a Ukrainian journalist and politician currently serving as a People's Deputy of Ukraine from Ukraine's 65th electoral district as a member of Servant of the People.

Early life and career 
Dmytro Serhiyovych Kostiuk was born on 1 June 1993 in Novohrad-Volynskyi, within Zhytomyr Oblast of Ukraine (now named Zviahel). He graduated from the historical faculty of Taras Shevchenko National University of Kyiv. He worked as a journalist at Espreso TV, and was a member of the "Indivisible Ukraine" non-governmental organisation. He was also chairman of the Holosiivskyi District branch of the Democratic Alliance party.

Political career 
Kostiuk ran in the 2019 Ukrainian parliamentary election as the candidate of Servant of the People for People's Deputy of Ukraine in Ukraine's 65th electoral district. At the time of his campaign, he was an independent. Kostiuk defeated his closest opponent, incumbent People's Deputy Volodymyr Lytvyn, by a margin of 10.09%, winning 35.73% of the vote in total.

As a People's Deputy, Kostiuk is a member of the Servant of the People faction and the Verkhovna Rada Committee on Agriculture and Land Policies.

References 

1993 births
Living people
Ninth convocation members of the Verkhovna Rada
Servant of the People (political party) politicians
Taras Shevchenko National University of Kyiv, Historical faculty alumni